Huascar Jose Ynoa Ventura (born May 28, 1998) is a Dominican professional baseball pitcher for the Atlanta Braves of Major League Baseball (MLB). He made his MLB debut in 2019.

Career

Minnesota Twins
Ynoa signed with the Minnesota Twins as an international free agent in July 2014. During his time in the Twins organization, he played for the DSL Twins in 2015, the GCL Twins in 2016, and the Elizabethton Twins in 2017.

Atlanta Braves
On July 24, 2017, the Twins traded Ynoa to the Atlanta Braves in exchange for Jaime García and Anthony Recker. He was assigned to the Danville Braves for the rest of the 2017 season. He split the 2018 season between the Rome Braves and the Florida Fire Frogs. The Braves added him to their 40-man roster after the 2018 season. 

Ynoa opened the 2019 season playing for the Fire Frogs, and was promoted to the Mississippi Braves and the Gwinnett Stripers. The Braves promoted him to the major leagues on June 15, 2019. Ynoa made his major league debut the next day, against the Philadelphia Phillies. In the minor leagues in 2019 he was 4–8 and had a 5.09 earned run average (ERA) with 110 strikeouts in  innings. He pitched three innings in the majors in 2019. 

In 2020, Ynoa was 0–0 with a 5.82 ERA, in  innings, in nine games, including five starts.

On April 29, 2021, Ynoa hit his first career home run off of Chicago Cubs starter Kyle Hendricks. In his next start on May 4, he hit his first career grand slam off of Washington Nationals reliever Tanner Rainey. On May 17, 2021, Ynoa was put on the 10-day injured list due to a fractured right hand. In his previous start, he allowed 5 runs in 4.1 innings against the Milwaukee Brewers, and suffered the injury when he punched a bench out of frustration. He was placed on the 60-day injured list on May 31. On August 17, Ynoa was activated off of the injured list.

In 2021, he was 4–6	with a 4.05 ERA. Ynoa pitched out of the Braves ‘ bullpen in the National League Division Series against the Brewers. As the Braves advanced to the National League Championship Series against the Los Angeles Dodgers, Ynoa was scheduled to start Game 4. However, he suffered a shoulder injury as he prepared hours before. The Braves ruled Ynoa out for the game and Jesse Chavez started in his place. Ynoa was also replaced on the roster by Dylan Lee, making him ineligible to play again in the 2021 postseason. The Braves eventually won the 2021 World Series, their first title since 1995.

Ynoa began the 2022 season in the Atlanta Braves' pitching rotation, making two ineffective appearances before a demotion to the Gwinnett Braves in April. In September, the organization announced that Ynoa needed Tommy John Surgery.

Personal life
Ynoa's brother, Michael, has played in the major leagues.

References

External links

Living people
1998 births
Major League Baseball players from the Dominican Republic
Major League Baseball pitchers
Atlanta Braves players
Dominican Summer League Twins players
Gulf Coast Twins players
Elizabethton Twins players
Danville Braves players
Rome Braves players
Florida Fire Frogs players
Mississippi Braves players
Gwinnett Stripers players
People from Puerto Plata, Dominican Republic